Georgi Gradev (born 27 December 1975) is a former Bulgarian footballer who currently works as a football agent and is an expert when it comes to the legal aspects of sports.

Biography

Gradev was born in Sofia, but grew up in Morocco, where his father was previously employed. He started his playing career with the youth team of Levski Sofia. He is a member of Gradev Sports EOOD and has represented many Bulgarian footballers, while also often being critical of the Bulgarian Football Union's decisions. Gradev was formerly married to Radostina Rangelova, an international volleyball player from Bulgaria.

References

External links
Official website
Facebook profile

1975 births
Living people
Footballers from Sofia
Bulgarian footballers
Bulgarian expatriate footballers
Association football goalkeepers